Fath Shah was a Sultan of the Shah Mir dynasty of Kashmir. Fath took the throne of Kashmir in 1486 CE.
Muhammad Shah regained the throne in 1495 but Fath soon after retook it in 1516 after killing Muhammad Shah in a battle near Kupwara and occupying the throne of Srinagar once again. Fath Shah reconstructed the towns of Pulwama and Anantnag. In 1533 Kashmir was raided by the Turco-Mongol military general Mirza Muhammad Haidar Dughlat who was fighting on behalf of the Sultan of the Yarkent Khanate, Sultan Said Khan. Mirza Muhammad Haidar Dughlat conquered Kashmir in the year 1540 thereby abolishing the Shah Mir dynasty.

References

Rulers of Kashmir
Dethroned monarchs
16th-century deaths